The Haunted Ship is a 1927 American silent drama film directed by Forrest Sheldon and starring Dorothy Sebastian, Montagu Love and Tom Santschi. It is based on a story White and Yellow by Jack London.

Cast
 Dorothy Sebastian as Goldie Kane 
 Montagu Love as Captain Simon Gant 
 Tom Santschi as Glenister (first mate)
 Ray Hallor as Danny Gant 
 Pat Harmon as Mate 
 Alice Lake as Martha Gant 
 Bud Duncan as Dinty 
 Blue Washington as Mose 
 Sôjin Kamiyama as Bombay Charlie 
 Andrée Tourneur as Goldie's Companion

References

Bibliography
 Munden, Kenneth White. The American Film Institute Catalog of Motion Pictures Produced in the United States, Part 1. University of California Press, 1997.

External links

1927 films
1927 drama films
Silent American drama films
Films directed by Forrest Sheldon
American silent feature films
1920s English-language films
Tiffany Pictures films
Seafaring films
American black-and-white films
Films based on works by Jack London
1920s American films
Silent adventure films